Palang Darreh or Palangdarreh may refer to:

Palang Darreh, Fuman, Gilan Province
Palang Darreh, Rudbar, Gilan Province
Palang Darreh, Mazandaran
Palang Darreh, North Khorasan
Palang Darreh, Tehran